The atomic whirl is the logo of the American Atheists, and has come to be used as a symbol of atheism in general.

The Atomic Whirl is based on the historical Rutherford model of the atom, which erroneously showed the orbital paths of electrons around the central nucleus, and not on the atomic orbitals. It resembles the authoritative logos and symbols of the United States Atomic Energy Commission and the International Atomic Energy Agency who also based their designs on the Rutherford Model. The symbol is used by the American Atheists organization to symbolize that "only through the use of scientific analysis and free, open inquiry can humankind reach out for a better life".

The lower part of the central loop is left open or "broken" to represent the fact that atheists accept that while they rely on the scientific method, they are searching for the answers, and in some cases, further questions. This central loop forms an "A" which represents the word "atheism".

American Atheists has a copyright on the symbol.

Approved emblem of belief (US)
This symbol is one of the permitted "Emblems of Belief" that the United States Department of Veterans Affairs allows on government-furnished headstones and markers.

See also
Rutherford model
Atheism

References 

Atheism
Logos